The Laz language is a Kartvelian language spoken by the Laz people on the southeastern shore of the Black Sea. In 2007, it was estimated that there were around 20,000 native speakers in Turkey, in a strip of land extending from Melyat to the Georgian border (officially called Lazistan until 1925), and around 1,000 native speakers around Adjara in Georgia. There are also around 1,000 native speakers of Laz in Germany.

Classification 
Laz is one of the four Kartvelian languages. Along with Mingrelian, it forms the Zan branch of this Kartvelian language family. The two languages are very closely related, to the extent that some linguists refer to Mingrelian and Laz as dialects or regional variants of a single Zan language, a view held officially in the Soviet era and still so in Georgia today. In general, however, Mingrelian and Laz are considered as separate languages, due both to the long-standing separation of their communities of speakers (500 years) and to a lack of mutual intelligibility. The Laz are shifting to the Turkish of Trebizond.

Geographical distribution 

The Georgian language, along with its relatives Mingrelian, Laz, and Svan, comprise the Kartvelian language family. The initial breakup of Proto-Kartvelian is estimated to have been around 2500–2000 B.C., with the divergence of Svan from Proto-Kartvelian (Nichols, 1998). Assyrian, Urartian, Greek, and Roman documents reveal that in early historical times (2nd–1st millennia B.C.), the numerous Kartvelian tribes were in the process of migrating into the Caucasus from the southwest. The northern coast and coastal mountains of Asia Minor were dominated by Kartvelian peoples at least as far west as Samsun. Their eastward migration may have been set in motion by the fall of Troy (dated by Eratosthenes to 1183 B.C.). It thus appears that the Kartvelians represent an intrusion into the Georgian plain from northeastern Anatolia, displacing their predecessors, the unrelated Northwest Caucasian and Vainakh peoples, into the Caucasian highlands (Tuite, 1996; Nichols, 2004).

The oldest known settlement of the Lazoi is the town of Lazos or "old Lazik" which Arrian puts 680 stadia (about 80 miles) south of the Sacred Port (Novorossiisk) and 1,020 stadia (100 miles) north of Pityus, i.e.somewhere in the neighborhood of Tuapse. Kiessling sees in the Lazoi a section of the Kerketai, who in the first centuries of the Christian era had to migrate southwards under pressure from the Zygoi. The same author regards the Kerketai as a "Georgian" tribe. The fact is that at the time of Arrian (2nd century A.D.), the Lazoi were already living to the south of Um. The order of the peoples living along the coast to the east of Trebizond was as follows: Colchi (and Sanni); Machelones; Heniochi; Zydritae; Lazai, subjects of King Malassus, who owned the suzerainty of Rome; Apsilae; Abacsi; Sanigae near Sebastopolis.

Social and cultural status 

Laz has no official status in either Turkey or Georgia, and no written standard. It is presently used only for familiar and casual interaction; for literary, business, and other purposes, Laz speakers use their country's official language (Turkish or Georgian).

Laz is unique among the Kartvelian languages in that most of its speakers live in Turkey rather than Georgia. While the differences between the various dialects are minor, their speakers feel that their level of mutual intelligibility is low. Given that there is no common standard form of Laz, speakers of its different dialects use Turkish to communicate with each other.

Between 1930 and 1938, Zan (Laz and Mingrelian) enjoyed cultural autonomy in Georgia and was used as a literary language, but an official standard form of the language was never established. Since then, all attempts to create a written tradition in Zan have failed, despite the fact that most intellectuals use it as a literary language.

In Turkey, Laz has been a written language since 1984, when an alphabet based on the Turkish alphabet was created. Since then, this system has been used in most of the handful of publications that have appeared in Laz. Developed specifically for the Kartvelian languages, the Georgian alphabet is better suited to the sounds of Laz, but the fact that most of the language's speakers live in Turkey, where the Latin alphabet is used, has rendered the adoption of the former impossible. Nonetheless, 1991 saw the publication of a textbook called Nana-nena ('Mother tongue'), which was aimed at all Laz speakers and used both the Latin and Georgian alphabets. The first Laz–Turkish dictionary was published in 1999.

Speaking Laz was forbidden in Turkey between 1980 and 1991 because this was seen as a political threat to unity of the country. Because speaking Laz was banned in public areas, many children lost their mother tongue as a result of not communicating with their parents. Most Laz people have a heavy Turkish accent because they can not practice their mother tongue.

Statistics in Turkey (1935-2007)

Writing system 

Laz is written in Mkhedruli script and in an extension of the Turkish alphabet. For the Laz letters written in the Latin script, the first is a letter from the writing system introduced in Turkey in 1984 that was developed by Fahri Lazoğlu and Wolfgang Feurstein and the second is the transcription system used by Caucasianists.

Linguistic features 
Like many languages of the Caucasus, Laz has a rich consonantal system (in fact, the richest among the Kartvelian family) but only five vowels (a, e, i, o, u). The nouns are inflected with agglutinative suffixes to indicate grammatical function (four to seven cases, depending on the dialect) and number (singular or plural), but not by gender.
The Laz verb is inflected with suffixes according to person and number, and also for grammatical tense, aspect, mood, and (in some dialects) evidentiality. Up to 50 verbal prefixes are used to indicate spatial orientation/direction. Person and number suffixes provided for the subject as well as for one or two objects involved in the action, e.g. gimpulam = "I hide it from you".

Phonology

Grammar 

Some distinctive features of Laz among its family are:
 All nouns end with a vowel.
 More extensive verb inflection, using directional prefixes.
 Substantial lexical borrowings from Greek and Turkic languages.

See also 
Colchis
Kaskian language

References

Bibliography 
 Anderson, Ralph Dewitt. (1963). A Grammar of Laz. Ann Arbor: UMI. (Doctoral dissertation, Austin: University of Texas at Austin; vi+127pp.)
 Grove, Timothy (2012). Materials for a Comprehensive History of the Caucasus, with an Emphasis on Greco-Roman Sources. A Star in the East: Materials for a Comprehensive History of the Caucasus, with an Emphasis on Greco-Roman sources (2012)
 Kojima, Gôichi (2003) Lazuri grameri Chiviyazıları, Kadıköy, İstanbul,  (notes in English and Turkish)
 Nichols, Johanna (1998). The origin and dispersal of languages: Linguistic evidence. In N. G. Jablonski & L. C. Aiello (Eds.), The origin and diversification of language. San Francisco: California Academy of Sciences.
 Nichols, Johanna (2004). The origin of the Chechen and Ingush: A study in Alpine linguistic and ethnic geography. Anthropological Linguistics 46(2): 129-155. 
 Tuite, Kevin. (1996). Highland Georgian paganism — archaism or innovation?: Review of Zurab K’ik’nadze. 1996. Kartuli mitologia, I. ǰvari da saq’mo. (Georgian mythology, I. The cross and his people [sic].). Annual of the Society for the Study of Caucasia 7: 79-91.

External links 

  Lazkulturdernegi.org.tr
  Laz Cultur – Information about Lazs, Laz Language, Culture, Music
  Laz Cultur – Information about Lazs, Laz Language, Culture, Music
  Laz Cultur – Information about Lazs, Laz Language, Culture, Music and Laz Diaspora

 Lazuri Nena – The Language of the Laz by Silvia Kutscher.
 Laz-Turkish full dictionary in word format
 Samples of Laz Language in English, Dutch and Turkish, Arzu Barské - Erdogan on Yahoo! GeoCities
 Laz history and language, Lazlar, Yilmaz Erdogan on Yahoo! GeoCities
 Laz Georgian-Latin and Latin-Georgian converter

 
Agglutinative languages
Languages of Georgia (country)
Languages of Turkey
Definitely endangered languages
Kartvelian languages
Georgian-Zan languages